Strigatella coffea (common name: coffee mitre) is a species of sea snail, a marine gastropod mollusk in the family Mitridae, the miters or miter snails.

Description
The shell size varies between 32 mm and  60 mm

Distribution
This species is distributed in the Indian Ocean along Madagascar, Mauritius and the Mascarene Basin; in the Pacific Ocean along Tahiti and Hawaii

References

External links
 Gastropods.com : Mitra (Mitra) coffea; accessed : 13 December 2010

Mitridae
Gastropods described in 1829